Juan Carlos Oleniak (born 4 March 1942) is an Argentine former footballer who played as a forward for clubs in Argentina, Mexico, Chile and Uruguay, as well as the Argentina national team at the 1962 FIFA World Cup in Chile. He also competed at the 1960 Summer Olympics.

Career
After he retired from playing, Oleniak became a football coach. He managed Racing Club de Avellaneda on an interim basis after Nelson Chabay resigned in 1990.

Honours
Racing Club
 Argentine Primera División: 1961

References

External links
 
 
 

1942 births
Living people
Footballers from Buenos Aires
Argentine footballers
Association football forwards
Argentina international footballers
Argentine Primera División players
Chilean Primera División players
Liga MX players
Racing Club de Avellaneda footballers
Argentinos Juniors footballers
Universidad de Chile footballers
C.D. Veracruz footballers
Santiago Wanderers footballers
Huracán Buceo players
San Martín de Mendoza footballers
1962 FIFA World Cup players
Olympic footballers of Argentina
Footballers at the 1960 Summer Olympics
Racing Club de Avellaneda managers
Argentine people of Ukrainian descent
Pan American Games medalists in football
Pan American Games gold medalists for Argentina
Footballers at the 1959 Pan American Games
Argentine football managers
Medalists at the 1959 Pan American Games
Argentine expatriate footballers
Expatriate footballers in Chile
Argentine expatriate sportspeople in Chile
Expatriate footballers in Mexico
Argentine expatriate sportspeople in Mexico
Expatriate footballers in Uruguay
Argentine expatriate sportspeople in Uruguay